Honneur Stadium (Stade d'Honneur) is a multi-purpose stadium in Oujda, Morocco.  It is used mostly for football matches.  The stadium has a capacity of 19,000 people.

References

Football venues in Morocco
Multi-purpose stadiums in Morocco
Oujda
Buildings and structures in Oriental (Morocco)
1976 establishments in Morocco
20th-century architecture in Morocco